The Derwent Valley Water Board was constituted by Act of Parliament in 1899 to supply the cities of Derby, Leicester, Nottingham and Sheffield, and the county of Derbyshire, with water impounded by a series of reservoirs along the upper reaches of the River Derwent in the Peak District of Derbyshire.

The Board's works included the following reservoirs:

The board was abolished in 1974 under the terms of the Water Act 1973 and responsibility for the works was transferred to the new Severn Trent Water Authority.

References

 The Derwent Valley Water Board's Undertaking (1972)
 Water Act 1973 (1973 c.37)
 https://archive.org/stream/engineeringwonde03willuoft/engineeringwonde03willuoft_djvu.txt
 http://apps.nationalarchives.gov.uk/nra/onlinelists/GB0288%20DL76.pdf

Utilities of the United Kingdom